Kleiton Pego Duarte (born 23 April 1999), simply known as Kleiton, is a Brazilian footballer who plays as either a right back or a forward for Tombense, on loan from Athletico Paranaense.

Career statistics

Club

Honours
Athletico Paranaense
Campeonato Paranaense: 2020

References

External links
Athletico Paranaense profile 

1999 births
Living people
People from Ipatinga
Brazilian footballers
Association football defenders
Association football forwards
Campeonato Brasileiro Série C players
Club Athletico Paranaense players
Santa Cruz Futebol Clube players
Sportspeople from Minas Gerais